Alexander McLaren (December 10, 1859 – July 2, 1916) was an Ontario farmer and political figure. He represented Hastings East in the Legislative Assembly of Ontario as a Liberal-Patrons of Industry member from 1894 to 1898.

He was born in Melrose, Hastings County. He died in Belleville in 1916.

References

External links 
The Canadian parliamentary companion, 1897 JA Gemmill

1859 births
1916 deaths
Ontario Patrons of Industry MPPs
People from Hastings County